Rhead A. Story (June 21, 1970 – April 4, 2013) was an American politician from New Mexico known for challenging Democratic incumbent Al Park in 2008 for the District 26 seat in the New Mexico House of Representatives. Story was also the 2012 campaign adviser for Gary Smith, who challenged incumbent Janice Arnold-Jones for the Republican ticket in the 2012 U.S. House election to represent New Mexico's 1st congressional district.

Personal life
Rhead A. Story was born June 21, 1970 in Frederick, Oklahoma, to James "Dave" Story and his wife Ellen. James was a columnist and publisher and Ellen was a housewife who raised both Rhead and his brother James "Jamie" D. Jr.

Together with his wife Wanda (née Morley), Story had sons Tristian and Nicholas.

Story died April 4, 2013, after complications from heart surgery.

Politics

2008 election
Story ran in the 2008 election to represent District 26 for the New Mexico House of Representatives against Democratic incumbent Al Park. One of Story's political positions was that housing was too unaffordable in New Mexico, stating "[t]he housing needs of New Mexico citizens have not been satisfactorily addressed. Under the current administration, money and assets have been misappropriated and mismanaged, by the housing authority, which has not only wasted taxpayer dollars but has prevented assistance from getting to those most in need."

Park raised $121,894 for his campaign while Story raised $1,167 before losing in the general election.

The Right to Life Committee of New Mexico endorsed Story in his candidacy.

Advisor
Story was the 2012 campaign advisor for Gary Smith, who challenged incumbent Janice Arnold-Jones for the Republican ticket in the 2012 U.S. House election to represent New Mexico's 1st congressional district. Smith was deemed ineligible to run after fellow Republican challenger Dan Lewis withdrew from the race, making Arnold-Jones the last GOP contender. Arnold-Jones lost the seat to Democrat Michelle Lujan Grisham in the popular election.

References

Politicians from Albuquerque, New Mexico
New Mexico Republicans
1970 births
2013 deaths
21st-century American politicians